Mátyás Tajti (born 2 June 1998) is a Hungarian professional footballer who plays for Zalaegerszeg.

Club statistics

Updated to games played as of 25 August 2019.

References

External links

1998 births
Footballers from Budapest
Living people
Hungarian footballers
Hungary youth international footballers
Hungary under-21 international footballers
Association football defenders
Atlético Malagueño players
Diósgyőri VTK players
Zagłębie Lubin players
Zalaegerszegi TE players
Nemzeti Bajnokság I players
Ekstraklasa players
III liga players
Hungarian expatriate footballers
Expatriate footballers in Spain
Hungarian expatriate sportspeople in Spain
Expatriate footballers in Poland
Hungarian expatriate sportspeople in Poland